Foster Joseph Andoh (born 18 August 1961) is the member of parliament of Hemang Lower Denkyira in the Central region of Ghana.

Personal life 
Foster is married with three children. He is a Christian (Assemblies of God Church).

Early life and education 
Foster was born on 18 August 1961 in Twifo-Hemang in Central region. He had his BA in management in UCC in 2009. He had Diploma from Ghana Institute of Journalism in 1988–1990, He had his Post-Sec Cert 'A' in 1976–1981.

Politics 
Foster is member of National Democratic Congress.

Employment 
He was an International Diplomat. He was the District Chief Executive from 2009 to 2012. He was  the Sales Manager of Pasica Ghana Limited from 1991 to 2008. He is a Marketer/Manager.

References 

Living people
National Democratic Congress (Ghana) politicians
University of Cape Coast alumni
1961 births
Ghanaian MPs 2013–2017